This is a list of the series that have run in Kodansha's shōnen manga magazine, Weekly Shōnen Magazine. This list, organized by decade and year of when the series started, will list each series run in the manga magazine, the author of the series and, in case the series has ended, when it has ended.

1950s

1959

1960s

1960–1964

1965–1969

1970s

1970–1974

1975–1979

1980s

1980–1984

1985–1989

1990s

1990–1994

1995–1999

2000s

2000–2004

2005–2009

2010s

2010–2014

2015–2019

2020s

2020–present

References

Lists of manga series
Kodansha manga